Louisa Reef (Brunei ; Mandarin ) is a coral atoll in the southern reaches of the Spratly Islands. The reef is oval in shape, approximately 1.5 km (1 mile) east to west and 0.5 km (500 yards) north to south.  While most of Louisa Reef is submerged, some portions emerge at low tide and a few small rocks remain above water even at high tide. The atoll rises as deeply undercut walls and steep slopes from very deep water with extensive stony and soft corals. A navigation beacon built by Malaysia is at its southwest point and the highest visible rock is at the southeast end.

Safe anchorage is difficult to find, depending on the wind and currents, but there are sandy areas at the northwest and southwest ends. The nearest reliable shelter for boats is the lagoon at Swallow Reef, 128 km (80 miles) to the northeast.

, the shoal was claimed by Brunei, China, and Taiwan. Malaysia previously claimed Louisa Reef and operated a small obelisk-like concrete navigational light beacon  there. However, Malaysia has apparently dropped its claim in deference to the claim of neighbouring Brunei that the reef lies on its continental shelf.

References

External links 
 Map showing Louisa Reef within Brunei claim

Reefs of the Spratly Islands
Islands of Brunei